International Distillers & Vintners was a brewing and wine and spirits distribution company, formed from the 1962 merger of W&A Gilbey and United Wine Traders.

Founders 
W&A Gilbey was founded in 1857 as a gin distillery by Sir Walter Gilbey, but by 1962 had a diversified family share holding, chaired by former figure skater and politician, Ronald Gilbey. He had resigned from London County Council in 1958, to become chairman of W&A Gilbey, a post he held for eleven years. At the time of the merger, Gilbey's was the largest wine and spirits company in the United Kingdom. 

In 1972, the company was bought by Watney Mann, and became their consolidated wine and spirits division. The group was taken over by Grand Metropolitan in 1972.

Merger 
In 1997, Guinness merged with Grand Metropolitan to create Diageo. In 1998 IDV was merged with United Distillers to create United Distillers & Vintners, forming the spirits division of Diageo plc.

References

Distilleries in the United Kingdom
Defunct breweries of the United Kingdom
Diageo
British companies established in 1962
Food and drink companies established in 1962
Food and drink companies disestablished in 1972